The Râul Târgului is a left tributary of the river Râul Doamnei in Romania. Its source is near the Păpușa Peak, in the Iezer Mountains. It discharges into the Râul Doamnei between Micești and Mioveni. Its upper course, upstream from the confluence with the Bătrâna, is also called Cuca.

Tributaries
The following rivers are tributaries to the Râul Târgului (from source to mouth):
Left: Lespezi, Valea lui Geantă, Valea Largă, Valea Calului, Valea Călușului, Mușuroaiele, Dobriașul Mare, Valea Poienii, Dobriașul Mic, Pârâul Maricăi, Valea Rumâneștilor, Poienari, Ruda, Drăghici, Mănăstirea, Argeșel
Right: Tambura, Frăcea, Bătrâna, Văcarea, Râușor, Valea Ursului, Bughea, Bratia

References

Rivers of Romania
Rivers of Argeș County